Aart Brederode (22 March 1942 – 8 May 2020) was a Dutch field hockey player. He competed in the men's tournament at the 1968 Summer Olympics.

References

External links
 

1942 births
2020 deaths
Dutch male field hockey players
Olympic field hockey players of the Netherlands
Field hockey players at the 1968 Summer Olympics
Field hockey players from The Hague